Vadiyala Mohan Reddy is an Indian professor at UCSF Medical Center in the United States.

References

External links 
 https://web.archive.org/web/20070228142022/http://med.stanford.edu/profiles/Vadiyala_Reddy/
 http://www.bizjournals.com/sanfrancisco/blog/2015/09/ucsf-lures-top-pediatric-heart-surgeon-stanford.html

American people of Telugu descent
Living people
All India Institute of Medical Sciences, New Delhi alumni
People from Nizamabad, Telangana
Indian emigrants to the United States
Stanford University School of Medicine faculty
American surgeons
Indian cardiac surgeons
American people of Indian descent in health professions
Year of birth missing (living people)